Pelle Rietveld (born 4 February 1985, in Boskoop) is a Dutch decathlete. He competed at the 2013 World Championships in Moscow, Russia. He is also a very good javelin thrower with a PB of 71.66 metres. Right now he is the trainer from Nadine Broersen.

Competition record

References

External links 
 Profile

1985 births
Living people
Dutch decathletes
People from Boskoop
World Athletics Championships athletes for the Netherlands
21st-century Dutch people